Katzensee is a lake on the border of the city of Zürich and Regensdorf in the Canton of Zürich, Switzerland. There is also a public bath/lido Strandbad Katzensee on its southern shore.

External links

Regensdorf
Lakes of the canton of Zürich
Geography of Zürich
LKatzensee
LKatzensee